The Brave One can refer to:

 The Brave One (1956 film), a 1956 American drama film directed by Irving Rapper
 The Brave One (2007 film), a 2007 crime-drama/psychological thriller film directed by Neil Jordan

See also
 The Brave Ones, a 1916 silent film